Dima is a Papuan language of New Guinea. A word lists of Dima can be found in Ray (1938).

References

Languages of Milne Bay Province
Dagan languages